Economics II is the second album released by American stand-up comedian Jim Gaffigan. The album was released in 2001.

Track listing 
Ethnic / Being Pale
Glasses / Vision
Sleep
Family / Dad
Indiana
Birthday / Jesus
Postcard
TV
Lazy
Technology / Umbrella
1700s / Museum
Beauty
Reading in Church
Roscoe "The Wood Guy"
Coach Glacken / Heckler

Jim Gaffigan live albums
Stand-up comedy albums
2001 live albums
2000s comedy albums